The Okada's five-lined skink or Far Eastern skink (Plestiodon latiscutatus, Jap. オカダトカゲ Okada-Tokage) is a species of lizard which is endemic to Japan.

Taxonomy 
The species was first described by the American herpetologist Edward Hallowell in 1861. There are no recognized subspecies. During the 20th century it was placed in the genus Eumeces which now contains African and Middle-Eastern skinks. It was long named Eumeces okadae but changed to latiscutatus according to the rules of nomenclature and priority.

Description 

The total length is between 15 and 24 cm and the snout-vent length 60 to 96 mm. Similar species are P. japonicus and P. finitimus. The color of P. latiscutatus is more greenish than for P. japonicus. Juveniles have a blue tail which is also more greenish than for P. japonicus and the striped pattern of P. latiscutatus disappears sooner. On the outer Izu islands the skinks usually have more rows of body scales than P. japonicus. Overall the species are best distinguished by their geographic range.

Behavior 
It preys on earthworms, spiders, ants, Amphipoda and other invertebrates. The mating season is in spring from mid-April to late May. Females lay clutches of four to twelve eggs every two years. The size of the clutches varies from island to island with a higher number of eggs per clutch on islands with low population densities. The females care for the eggs until they hatch as all Japanese species of Plestiodon. While remaining with the eggs, the females roll them about in the nest. Experiments where the females were instead removed from their nests showed that the eggs usually didn't survive.

Geographic range and threats 

It is found on the Izu Islands and the Izu Peninsula. The IUCN lists the species as least concern. However, some subpopulations on the Izu islands Miyake-jima, Hachijō-jima and Aogashima have been in decline due to the introduction of Japanese weasels as a predator species in order to control rats. There is also hybridization on Hachijō-jima with introduced P. japonicus. On the Japanese Red List the species is therefore listed as species with Locally endangered Population on these three islands. The majority population on the Izu Peninsula is considered as stable.

The ranges of two Plestiodon species border P. latiscutatus:  P. japonicus is found in southwestern Honshū with the exception of the Izu Peninsula and on Shikoku and Kyushu as well as surrounding islands. On the Izu Islands P. japonicus is only found on Hachijō-jima, where it was introduced. P. finitimus is dirstributed north to P. latiscutatus on Honshū and Hokkaido. The species border runs in the northwest of the Izu Peninsula along the lower Fuji River which is located southwest of Fuji-san. On the northeastern side of Izu Peninsula and southeast of Fuji-san it runs along Sakawa River. This coincides with a former sea that is assumed to have separated the Izu Peninsula which is located on the Philippine Sea Plate from the rest of modern-day Honshū until the mid-Pleistocene. Similar biogeographic borders exist for the woodlouse species Ligia oceanica and for land-snails. The three Plestiodon species only overlap in a small range and show clear differences in mitochondrial DNA sequence.

Other species of the genus found in Japan are distributed on the Nansei Islands:
 P. barbouri on Amami Islands and Okinawa Islands
 P. elegans on Senkaku Islands and Taiwan, Southeast-China and North-Vietnam
 P. kishinouyei on Miyako and Yaeyama Islands
 P. kuchinoshimensis auf Kuchinoshima in the northern Tokara Islands
 P. marginatus on Okinawa, Amami and Tokara Islands
 P. oshimensis on Amami and Tokara Islands
 P. stimpsonii on Yaeyama Islands
 P. takarai on four of the Senkaku Islands

References

latiscutatus
Endemic reptiles of Japan
Reptiles described in 1861
Taxa named by Edward Hallowell (herpetologist)